15 Éxitos, or 15 Exitos, may refer to:

 15 Éxitos (Alejandra Guzmán album), 2002
 15 éxitos (Flor Silvestre album), 1984
 15 éxitos, vol. 2 (Flor Silvestre album)
 15 Éxitos Vol. 1 (Los Caminantes album), 1983
 15 Éxitos Vol. 2 (Los Caminantes album), 1985
 15 Éxitos Vol. 3 (Los Caminantes album), 1987
 15 Exitos de Juan Gabriel, 2004
 15 Éxitos: Corridos Famosos, 1991